Anglic may refer to:

 Something related to the Angles
 Old English language
 Other Anglic languages descended from Old English
 A simplified system of English spelling invented by Swedish philologist Robert Eugen Zachrisson in 1930

See also
 Angelic (disambiguation)
 Anglian (disambiguation)